Jason Daks Belser (born May 28, 1970) is a former American football defensive back in the National Football League. He played college football for the Oklahoma Sooners. He played high school football at Raytown South High School in Raytown, Missouri.  He is currently the head football coach at Freedom High School in South Riding, Virginia.

He is the son of Caesar and Evelyn Belser.

External links
NFL.com player page

1970 births
Living people
Players of American football from Kansas City, Missouri
African-American players of American football
American football safeties
Oklahoma Sooners football players
Indianapolis Colts players
Kansas City Chiefs players
21st-century African-American sportspeople
20th-century African-American sportspeople
Ed Block Courage Award recipients